Steven Robert Pelé (born 28 August 1981) is a French former professional footballer who played as a defender. He is the older brother of Yohann Pelé.

Coaching career
In the summer 2016, Pelé joined Séné FC as a playing manager.

Ahead of the 2019–20 season, he became the manager of ESSA Saint-Avé Football.

Honours
France U18
UEFA European Under-18 Championship: 2000

References

External links

Profile at FrenchFootballLeague.com

1981 births
Living people
Footballers from Seine-et-Marne
Association football defenders
French footballers
Stade Rennais F.C. players
RC Strasbourg Alsace players
En Avant Guingamp players
Grenoble Foot 38 players
FC Gueugnon players
FC Universitatea Cluj players
Vannes OC players
US Pontet Grand Avignon 84 players
Ligue 1 players
Ligue 2 players
Liga I players
Championnat National players
French expatriate footballers
Expatriate footballers in Romania
French expatriate sportspeople in Romania